Windsor may refer to:

Places

Australia
Windsor, New South Wales
 Municipality of Windsor, a former local government area
Windsor, Queensland, a suburb of Brisbane, Queensland
Shire of Windsor, a former local government authority around Windsor, Queensland
Town of Windsor, a former local government authority around Windsor, Queensland
Windsor, South Australia, a small town in the northern Adelaide Plains
Windsor Gardens, South Australia, a suburb of Adelaide 
Windsor, Victoria, a suburb of Melbourne

Canada
Grand Falls-Windsor, Newfoundland and Labrador
Windsor, Nova Scotia
Windsor, Ontario
Windsor, Quebec

New Zealand
Windsor, New Zealand, a township in North Otago

United Kingdom
Windsor, Berkshire, a town near London
Windsor Castle, Windsor, Berkshire
Windsor Great Park
Windsor (UK Parliament constituency), the constituency centred on this town
Old Windsor, a village near Windsor
Windsor, Belfast, a suburb
Windsor, Cornwall, a hamlet
Windsor, Lincolnshire, a hamlet

United States
Windsor, California
Windsor, Colorado
Windsor, Connecticut
Windsor Locks, Connecticut
 Windsor Locks station
Windsor, Alachua County, Florida
Windsor, Indian River County, Florida
Windsor, Georgia
Windsor, Mercer County, Illinois
Windsor, Shelby County, Illinois
Windsor, Indiana
Windsor, Kentucky
Windsor, Maine
Windsor, Massachusetts
Windsor, Missouri
Windsor, New Hampshire
Windsor, New Jersey
Windsor, New York, a town
 Windsor (village), New York, within the town
Windsor, North Carolina
Windsor, North Dakota
Windsor, Pennsylvania, a borough in York County
Windsor, South Carolina
Windsor, Vermont, a town
Windsor (CDP), Vermont, a census-designated place in the town
Windsor County, Vermont
Windsor, Virginia
Windsor Heights, West Virginia
Windsor, Wisconsin

People
House of Windsor, the house or dynasty of the present British Royal Family
Windsor (surname), including a list of people with the name
Barbara Windsor, English actress
Windsor Davies, English actor

Title
 Duke of Windsor, formerly King Edward VIII of the United Kingdom
 Wallis Simpson (Wallis, Duchess of Windsor), wife of the Duke
 Earl of Windsor
 Viscount Windsor
 Baron Windsor

Design
Windsor cap, soft men's cap
Windsor chair, type of chair with a solid wood seat and turned legs
Windsor glasses, type of eyeglasses with circular eyerims and a thin frame
Windsor knot, type of knot used to tie a necktie
Windsor (typeface), a 1905 serif typeface that became popular in the 1970s

Structures
Windsor Castle, one of the homes of the monarch of Britain
Windsor House (Belfast), a skyscraper in Northern Ireland
Windsor Hotel (disambiguation), several places
Windsor Park, a football stadium which is home to Linfield F.C. and the Northern Ireland football team
Windsor station (disambiguation), stations of the name
Windsor Theatre (disambiguation), cinemas and theatres with this name
Windsor Tower (Madrid), a skyscraper in Madrid, Spain, which was destroyed in a fire in 2005
Windsor (Port Penn, Delaware), a house listed on the U.S. National Register of Historic Places (NRHP)
Windsor (Cascade, Virginia), a plantation complex listed on the NRHP

Transport 
 Windsor (automobile), defunct American automobile maker, 1929-1930
 Chrysler Windsor, car, 1930s-1960s
 Windsor (sloop), a ship wrecked off the coast of Australia in 1816
 HMS Windsor, several Royal Navy ships
 HMCS Windsor, a Canadian submarine
 USS Windsor, two ships by this name serving during WWII
 Vickers Windsor, World War II British heavy bomber
 Windsor-class attack transport, a class of US Navy ships used to transport troops and their equipment
 Ford Windsor engine, a small-block V8 engine formerly produced by Ford Motor Company

Other uses
The Windsors, UK sitcom
Windsor (film), a 2016 film starring Barry Corbin
Windsor (soil), the unofficial state soil of the U.S. state of Connecticut
United States v. Windsor, a 2013 United States Supreme Court decision concerning same-sex marriage 
Castle Windsor, part of the Castle Project (an open source application framework)
Windsor core, a version of the Athlon 64 CPU

See also

New Windsor (disambiguation)
Old Windsor
Windsor Castle (disambiguation)
Windsor Hills (disambiguation)
Windsor Historic District (disambiguation)
Windsor Lake (disambiguation)
Windsor Park (disambiguation)
Windsor Road (disambiguation)
Windsor Township (disambiguation)